Javier Botet López (born 30 July 1977) is a Spanish actor. Often cast in creature roles, he has portrayed Tristana Medeiros in the REC franchise (2007–2012), the title character in Mama (2013), Set in The Mummy (2017), and Slender Man in the 2018 film of the same name. His appearances in horror films also include Crimson Peak (2015), The Conjuring 2 (2016), 2 Pigeons (2017), It (2017) and its 2019 sequel, Insidious: The Last Key (2018), and Scary Stories to Tell in the Dark (2019). He is set to appear as Dracula in The Last Voyage of the Demeter.

Early life
Botet was born in Ciudad Real, the son of Agustín Andrés Botet Rodríguez and María del Carmen Servilia López Nieto.

At age five, he was diagnosed with Marfan syndrome.

Career
Botet's unique physical traits coupled with an interest in the performing arts led to his first film role in 2005, in Brian Yuzna's Beneath Still Waters. Two years later he played the role of Tristana Medeiros in Jaume Balagueró and Paco Plaza's 2007 film REC.

Theater and television
Botet has appeared in theater roles, including in 2010 as Frankenstein's monster in Teatros del Canal's stage adaptation of Frankenstein, as well as in television, where in 2019 Botet appeared as a member of an alien species known as the Ba'ul in one episode of Star Trek: Discovery. Also in 2019, Botet appeared as a wight in the Game of Thrones episode The Long Night.

Awards
On 7 October 2019 Botet, along with actress Maribel Verdú, received the Màquina del Temps Award at the 2019 Sitges Film Festival. The award is given annually to individuals from the fantasy world film-genre for their excellence in film work.

Personal life
Botet lives in Madrid.

Filmography

TV actor

Notes

References

External links
 

Spanish male film actors
Spanish male stage actors
Spanish male television actors
People from Ciudad Real
People with Marfan syndrome
1977 births
Living people
21st-century Spanish male actors